Kolanowice  (German: Kollanowitz, from 1936 Kniedorf) is a village in the administrative district of Gmina Łubniany, within Opole County, Opole Voivodeship, in south-western Poland.

The village has an approximate population of 500.

References

Kolanowice